Jayarathna Herath is a Sri Lankan politician, a member of the Parliament of Sri Lanka and a government minister.

References
 

Year of birth missing (living people)
Living people
United People's Freedom Alliance politicians
Members of the 11th Parliament of Sri Lanka
Members of the 12th Parliament of Sri Lanka
Members of the 13th Parliament of Sri Lanka
Members of the 14th Parliament of Sri Lanka
Members of the 16th Parliament of Sri Lanka
Government ministers of Sri Lanka
Sri Lanka Freedom Party politicians